The City Canal was a short, and short-lived, canal excavated across the Isle of Dogs in east London, linking two reaches of the River Thames. Today, it has been almost completely reconstructed to form the South Dock of the West India Docks.

History
The West India Docks Act of 1799 allowed the City of London Corporation to construct a canal from Limehouse Reach to Blackwall Reach, across the Isle of Dogs. It was intended to provide a short cut for sailing ships, to save them travelling around the south of the Isle of Dogs to access the wharves in the upper reaches of the river. If winds were unfavourable, this journey could take some time. The idea had been suggested by Ralph Walker in 1796. The West India merchants employed him as an engineer, and with assistance from William Jessop, John Foulds and George Dance, who was the City of London's surveyor, he produced the detailed plans which enabled the Act of Parliament to be obtained. Jessop was appointed as engineer with Walker as resident engineer, in August 1799, but Walker departed in 1802 after a disagreement with Jessop following a structural failure of part of the works. The surrounding land also had to be raised to the same height.

One of the major contractors was John Dyson Jr., who was based at Newington near Bawtry in South Yorkshire at the time. He was awarded a contract for excavation of the canal in 1800, and another for gravel extraction from 1801 to 1805. A third contract, for excavation of the west lock was awarded in 1803. He was working on the lock walls in December 1802, and had moved his family to Mile End by this date. John Torr Foulds acted as assistant engineer for part of this period, from 1800 to 1802. James Spedding was employed in 1805 to construct coffer dams to allow the wing walls at the ends of the canal to be built. A dam he had built in the previous year for the East India Dock had partially failed after four weeks, but had been repaired. The problem was one of design rather than bad workmanship, and the City Canal dam worked successfully. The canal was completed in 1805 (officially opened on 9 December that year), having incorporated at its western end the Breach Dockyard, a mast and timber laying dock formed around a large linear pond. The canal cost £168,813, including the acquisition of land.

However, access to the canal was determined by the state of the tide and the transit slow. These factors meant the canal was not a financial success since the owners did not charge tolls. It soon became a liability and was sold, for £120,000, to the West India Dock Company, owner of the adjacent West India Docks, in 1829.

The company bought it mainly to prevent it from falling into other hands. Proposals for collier docks immediately south of the City Canal, and the opening of the St Katharine Docks in 1828, had heightened the company's awareness of the threat represented by other dock interests. They added a timber dock to the south of the canal in 1832–3, the last major building work at the docks for 20 years.

Some 30 years later (1866–70), in a scheme managed by engineer Sir John Hawkshaw, the canal was enlarged, the entrances were widened, and the complex was renamed the South West India Dock, later known as South Dock.

In 1926 it was decided that the South Dock should be connected to the West India import and export docks and to the Millwall Dock. The developments - a new South Dock east entrance lock and three passages to link the Millwall, South, Export and Import Docks - were divided into four contracts, and were completed in 1931 at a final cost of £1,311,981 for the dock works, considerably improving access to the docks.

Today
South Dock regularly plays host to medium-sized military vessels visiting London as it is the furthest point upstream that they can be turned around - courtesy of the reconstruction worked carried out in 1926-1931. There is no longer a route for vessels across the Isle of Dogs - only the reconstructed eastern entrance remains.

Bibliography

References

History of the London Borough of Tower Hamlets
London docks
Buildings and structures in the London Borough of Tower Hamlets
Canals in England
Canals in London
Port of London
Canals opened in 1805
1805 establishments in England